Baksi Nayak (11 September 1922 – 13 August 1993) was an Indian politician. He was elected to the Lok Sabha, the lower house of the Parliament of India as a member of the Swatantra Party. Nayak died on 13 August 1993, at the age of 70.

References

External links
Official biographical sketch in Lok Sabha website

1922 births
1993 deaths
Lok Sabha members from Odisha
Swatantra Party politicians